A variety of hardness-testing methods are available, including the Vickers, Brinell, Rockwell, Meyer and Leeb tests. Although it is impossible in many cases to give an exact conversion, it is possible to give an approximate material-specific comparison table for steels.

Hardness comparison table

References

Further reading
 ISO 18265: "Metallic materials — Conversion of hardness values" (2013)
 ASTM E140-12B(2019)e1: "Standard Hardness Conversion Tables for Metals Relationship Among Brinell Hardness, Vickers Hardness, Rockwell Hardness, Superficial Hardness, Knoop Hardness, Scleroscope Hardness, and Leeb Hardness" (2019)

External links
Hardness Conversion Table – Brinell, Rockwell,Vickers – Various steels . (Archived) (archived November 11, 2011)
Rockwell to Brinell conversion chart (Brinell, Rockwell A,B,C)
Struers hardness conversion table (Vickers, Brinell, Rockwell B,C,D)

 
Scientific comparisons